Kolak is an Indonesian dessert.

Kolak may also refer to:

 Kolak River, a river in Gujarat, India
 Daniel Kolak (born 1955), Croatian-American philosopher
 Rudi Kolak (1918–2004), Yugoslav and Bosnian communist politician
 Sara Kolak (born 1995), Croatian javelin thrower
 Kolak, Çameli